is a velodrome located in Matsudo, Chiba that conducts pari-mutuel Keirin racing - one of Japan's four authorized  where gambling is permitted. Its Keirin identification number for betting purposes is 31# (31 sharp).

Matsudo's oval is 333 meters in circumference. A typical keirin race of 2,015 meters consists of six laps around the course.

External links
Matsudo Keirin Home Page (Japanese)
keirin.jp Matsudo Information (Japanese)

Velodromes in Japan
Cycle racing in Japan
Sports venues in Chiba Prefecture
Matsudo